Thomas Francis Walsh (April 2, 1850 – April 8, 1910) was an Irish-American miner who discovered one of the largest gold mines in America.

Early life
Walsh was born April 2, 1850, to Michael Walsh, a farmer, and Bridget Scully. He was most likely born on his father's farm, Baptistgrange, in Lisronagh, Tipperary, Ireland. He had two siblings: a sister Maria, who married Arthur Lafferty, a two-gun police sergeant in Leadville, Colorado, and a brother Michael, who died in 1904 in Denver, Colorado of dropsy of the liver.

According to his daughter's book Father Struck It Rich, he became an apprentice to a millwright at the age of twelve and grew into a fine carpenter.

In 1869, he and Maria emigrated to the United States after the death of their father.  For a time, Thomas settled in Worcester, Massachusetts, with his aunts, Catherine and Bridget Walsh Power, who helped "shake the greenhorn off him."

Career
In the early 1870s Thomas he heeded the call to "go west, young man" and found himself in Colorado getting paid well for his carpentry skills. It has been said that at first Walsh was attracted to the opportunities that came with the gold rush, including trading goods and services at inflated prices, as opposed to the gold rush itself.

Gradually, he became more and more immersed in the world of gold and was soon trading mining equipment to prospectors for mining claims as payment. He also studied mining technology at night. In 1877 he moved to Leadville, Colorado with a small fortune of between $75,000 and $100,000. Along with his wife, he ran the Grand Central Hotel in Leadville.

Eventually Walsh was overcome by gold fever. Unlike other prospectors, however, he took a far more methodical and careful approach to prospecting which soon paid off.  In 1896, he came home and uttered the words which later became the title of his daughter's book: "Daughter, I've struck it rich!" The Camp Bird Gold Mine near Ouray, Colorado was soon turning out $5,000 a day in ore and the Walsh family became very wealthy. In a short period of time, Walsh had made a fortune totaling $3,000,000.

Washington, DC
The wealth that Walsh had accumulated provided the family with a lavish lifestyle that included trips to Europe, fine clothes, and expensive motor cars. Around 1898 the family moved to Washington, D.C. where Walsh was appointed by President William McKinley as a commissioner to the Paris Exposition of 1899.,

Personal life
On July 11, 1879 in Leadville, Colorado, he married Carrie Bell Reed. The couple had two children:

Evalyn Walsh, August 1, 1886 – April 24, 1947
Vinson Walsh, April 9, 1888 – August 19, 1905, who died in a car accident

In 1903 the family moved into an ornate mansion at 2020 Massachusetts Avenue. Later, the house became the Indonesian Embassy.  On January 23, 1909, The Aero Club of Washington was founded, with Walsh as president, to promote the new technology of aviation. Due to his prior involvement with the Paris Exposition, Walsh became friends with Leopold II of Belgium, for whom he designated a suite in his home. The King never made it to the United States but when Albert, Leopold's nephew, and his wife Elisabeth traveled to the United States in 1919, Walsh's wife, by then widowed, was decorated by the King for her service during World War I.

In 1908, Walsh's daughter Evalyn married Edward Beale McLean, the son of John Roll McLean, who later became the publisher and owner of The Washington Post from 1916-1933.

Walsh died on April 8, 1910, at his home in Washington, D.C.

Extended family
Thomas Walsh was a cousin twice removed of W. Arthur Garrity, Jr., the federal judge who issued the famous 1974 order that Boston schools desegregate by means of busing.

References

Sources
 An informal family history written by Margaret Kennedy (c.1972)
 Father Struck it Rich, by Evalyn Walsh McLean (1936)
 Hope by Mary Ryan (c.1998)

External links

1850 births
1910 deaths
People from County Tipperary
Irish emigrants to the United States (before 1923)
American miners
Irish miners
19th-century Irish people
People from Leadville, Colorado